Facundo Bueso Sanllehí (February 5, 1905 – January 24, 1960) was a physicist, educator, science communicator and athlete. He was born on February 5, 1905, in Mexico City, Mexico. His family was forced to flee to Spain in 1915 because of the Mexican Revolution. Later in 1917 the family moved from Spain to San Juan, Puerto Rico.

In 1927 he obtained a BS degree in Physics (Magna Cum Laude) from the University of Puerto Rico, Rio Piedras. He became a Teaching Assistant of Physics before obtaining his BS degree (1926–1927). He obtained a MS degree in Physics from the University of Chicago in 1929. In 1941 he earned his PhD from the University of Chicago. In 1940 and in 1941 he received the prestigious Guggenheim Fellowship for Physics for studies in the field of band spectra.

He worked at the University of Puerto Rico, Río Piedras campus since 1926–1960. He was a Physics Professor, Chairman of the Department of Physics, Dean of the College of Arts and Sciences. In 1943 he was named Dean of the Faculty of Natural Sciences. Facundo Bueso was the first person to hold that position. Bueso died on January 24, 1960, when the motor boat in which he traveled was overturned near Isla Verde.

He was an excellent communicator of science. He participated of many programs on radio and TV. He was selected to be in the Puerto Rican Sports Pavilion ("El Pabellón de la Fama del Deporte Puertorriqueño") (1950) and the Hall of Fame of Sports in Puerto Rico ("El Salón de la Fama del Deporte en Puerto Rico")(January 25, 1958). The University of Puerto Rico Río Piedras campus has a historical building named after him that is part of the Natural Sciences Faculty.

Early life and education 
He was born in Mexico City on February 5, 1905. His father was Francisco Bueso, a master carpenter from Valencia, Spain. His mother was Eulalia Sanllehí from Cataluña, Spain. He had an older brother named Francisco ("Paco") and a younger brother named Andrés, who was a painter. His family was forced to flee to Barcelona, Spain in 1915 because of the Mexican Revolution. His family moved from Barcelona to Puerto Rico to work for Rafael Margarida in Río Piedras.

Bueso and his brothers Francisco and Andrés were enrolled in the Escuela Modelo de la Universidad. This is an experimental school of the Education Faculty of the University of Puerto Rico established in 1902 (presently called "Escuela Laboratorio Elemental de la Universidad de Puerto Rico"). At the time classes were imparted in English. Bueso and his brothers did not know English. For this reason he was enrolled in the fourth grade but by the end of the school year he was reassigned to the grade corresponding to his age. He was the valedictorian of his class in 1919. He graduated from the experimental High School of the University of Puerto Rico ("Escuela Superior de la Universidad de Puerto Rico") in 1923 with honors.

Bueso spent a year at Rensselaer Polytechnic Institute with the intention of studying Electrical Engineering.

After that year he returned to Puerto Rico and enrolled in the College of Arts and Sciences at the University of Puerto Rico (1924). He entered in the R.O.T.C. program. He was President of the Student and Faculty Council (1927). He became a member of Phi Sigma Alpha fraternity. He obtained a BS degree in Physics from the University of Puerto Rico in 1927 (Magna Cum Laude) and was awarded the Scoville Medal from the Department of Physics and the Proficiency medal from the R.O.T.C. upon graduation.

During the summer of 1927, Facundo Bueso served as Instructor with the rank of Second Lieutenant in the Citizen's Military Training Camp (C.T.M.C.). He served as Second Lieutenant of the US Army in the Puerto Rico National Guard (1927–1929).

Facundo Bueso obtained a MS degree in Physics from the University of Chicago in 1929. He had among his teachers Albert A. Michelson (Nobel Prize Physics, 1907) and Arthur H. Compton (Nobel Prize 1927). The title of his thesis was "On the Spectrum of Germanium Tetrachloride and possibility of Nitrogen Isotopes". He obtained a PhD in Physics from the University of Chicago in 1941. The title of his thesis was "Rotational Analysis of the 2900Å Band of CO2+". His thesis advisor was Robert S. Mulliken who was awarded the Nobel Prize in Chemistry in 1966 (six years after Facundo Bueso's death). Facundo Bueso was awarded the prestigious Guggenheim Fellowship in 1940, 1941.

He worked at the University of Puerto Rico as Assistant Instructor in Physics (1926–34) before he had completed his Bachelor degree. He occupied the positions of Professor of Physics, Chairman of the Department of Physics, Dean of the College of Arts and Sciences, and Dean of the Faculty of Natural Sciences. He was the first Dean of the Faculty of Natural Sciences. The Faculty of Natural Sciences was created on July 16, 1943. Before that date it was known as the College of Arts and Sciences. As Dean of Natural Sciences, Facundo Bueso had many responsibilities. On many occasions he represented the Chancellor or the Natural Sciences Faculty.

Facundo Bueso married Carmen Luisa Nieva from Mayagüez in 1936. She obtained a Bachelor degree from the University of Puerto Rico (1935). She accompanied Facundo to Chicago where she studied to obtain a Master degree in Home Economics with a minor in Textiles at the University of Chicago. She did not complete her degree. They had three children: Hector Rafael, Luis Francisco ("Gugo") and Carmen Aulalia ("Carmín").

Professional associations and other organizations 
Facundo Bueso was a member of: American Physical Society, American Association for the Advancement of Science. He was President of the Science Section of the "Ateneo Puertorriqueño" (1942). Bueso was listed in the "American Men and Women of Science Editions 1-11 Cumulative Index" (1983). Bueso was President of the civic organization "Club Rotario de Río Piedras" (1943-1944).

Amateur radio 
Facundo Bueso became interested in radiotelegraphy as a teenager. He obtained a US government certification of amateur telegraphist in 1921. He obtained a Radio Operator, Commercial First Class License. Bueso's call signal was "4DA". He shared this hobby with important figures in Puerto Rico like Joaquín Agusty, Jesús T. Piñero, Ramón Mellado Parsons, Luis Rexach, J. Maduro Ramos and Enrique Camuñas among others in the Porto Rico Radio Club. This group of people were pioneers of radio since the first radio station arrived in Puerto Rico in 1922. The first AM radio station in Puerto Rico was WKAQ (it was the fifth in the world) and it was directed and administrated by Joaquín Agusty. During the summer of 1924 Facundo Bueso was hired as Radio Operator on board the ship named "S. S. Catherine."

Sports 
Facundo Bueso was a multi-sport athlete. During his undergraduate college years at the University of Puerto Rico he practiced volleyball, basketball, baseball, and track and field. He received numerous trophies and awards in sports. Facundo Bueso was President of the Athletic Association ("Sociedad Atlética") at the University of Puerto Rico (1926–1927). He was member of the "Real San Juan" soccer team. While he was a student at the University of Chicago he practiced tennis. He played tennis in tournaments in singles and doubles in Puerto Rico. During his time as Faculty the amount of time dedicated to sports decreased, but there are records of soccer games between Faculty and students. He was selected to be in the Puerto Rican Sports Pavilion ("El Pabellón de la Fama del Deporte Puertorriqueño") (1950) and the Hall of Fame of Sports in Puerto Rico ("El Salón de la Fama del Deporte en Puerto Rico")(January 25, 1958) together with Cosme Beitia, Hiram Bithorn, Rebekah Colberg, Sixto Escobar, Isidoro García, among other prominent Puerto Rican athletes.

Educator 
Facundo Bueso distinguished himself for being an excellent educator, not only clear in his presentations but also with a joy and sense of humor that also can be seen in his science outreach essays or in accounts by his former students. Facundo Bueso wrote two Physics textbooks for use in High School ("Ciencias Físicas"). He contributed to a science section in a journal aimed at school teachers "Escuela". He wrote together with other prominent academics (Emilio S. Belaval, Ramón Lavandero, Arturo Morales Carrión, María Luisa Muñoz, and others) a comprehensive survey of Puerto Rico in a book with the title "Puerto Rico".

Public Communication of Science 
Facundo Bueso had a commitment to improving the science literacy of the public, in particular the people of Puerto Rico. He presented hundreds of conferences on radio, TV, schools, clubs and universities. He wrote hundreds of science outreach essays for radio, TV, newspapers and magazines. He participated of public conferences, radio and TV interviews. In 1935 the government of Puerto Rico initiated a project of and educational series of programs called "Escuela del Aire." They transmitted educational programs through radio Monday through Friday's 9:30 am – 10:00 am and 3:00 pm – 3:30 pm. Bueso participated of this project "Escuela del Aire". WIPR also had evening education programs. Facundo Bueso had science outreach programs on WIPR radio, and later had programs in WIPR TV. He started a weekly 15-minute program in WIPR TV. Another TV program in which he participated was "Pregunte usted al ABC". This was a program in which the public asked questions and the three moderators were Luis A. Arrocena (expert in History and Literature), Antonio J. Colorado Capella (expert in Social Sciences) and Facundo Bueso (expert in Science). He participated of another popular TV program "Desafíe a los Expertos.

Other Organizations 
Facundo Bueso represented the University of Puerto Rico in the Oak Ridge Institute of Nuclear Studies. This Institute gathered 35 universities of the south of the USA. Facundo Bueso was selected as Councilor for Oak Ridge Institute of Nuclear Studies (1951). Together with other Faculty, Facundo Bueso organized the 10th Regional Symposium from the Oak Ridge Institute of Nuclear Studies at the University of Puerto Rico, Río Piedras (January 24–25, 1957) and Mayagüez (January 28, 1957). Dr. Lewis L. Strauss, President of the U.S. Atomic Energy Commission attended this Symposium.

Facundo Bueso was a consultant for the Civil Defense of Puerto Rico. He wrote an article "Estudios sobre lluvia Radioactiva Puerto Rico."

Death 
Facundo Bueso died on January 24, 1960, due to a motor boat accident 3–5 miles off the coast of the Isla Verde. Three persons were in the boat: Facundo Bueso, Kiko Pesquera and Roberto Ramos López. The conditions in the ocean were rough and the boat was overturned. They were near some coral reefs. Facundo Bueso was rescued by Santiago Panzardi but he was unconscious and had severe contusions on his forehead. He was taken to the Presbyterian Hospital and declared dead upon arrival. Only Kiko Pesquera survived the boating accident. This event impacted the people of Puerto Rico. The Puerto Rico Legislature, the House of Representatives and the Senate, expressed their grief and observed a minute of silence in memory of Facundo Bueso. His burial took place on January 25, 1960, with a funeral procession that started at the Faculty of Natural Sciences at the University of Puerto Rico. The Chancellor, all the Faculty, University administration staff, thousands of students, representatives of cultural circles, scientists, government officials and others participated of the funeral procession. His remains were buried at "Cementerio Buxeda Memorial" in Cupey.

Legacy 
The "Facundo Bueso Chair of Physics" was created and it was offered by the Chancellor Jaime Benítez Rexach to Dr. J. Robert Oppenheimer on February 29, 1960. The Spanish sculptor Francisco Vázquez Díaz "Compostela" (1898–1988) made a bust of Facundo Bueso (1961) of marble from the city of Caguas which is displayed in the Facundo Bueso building at the University of Puerto Rico, Río Piedras. This historical building of the Natural Sciences Faculty was designed by Henry Klumb. The building has an interesting "K" shape when seen from an aerial view. The artist Miguel Pou Becerra painted a portrait of Facundo Bueso that belongs to the Faculty of Natural Sciences. There is a public school with the name "Dr. Facundo Bueso" in San Juan. The "Premio Facundo Bueso" (also known as "Medalla Facundo Bueso") is a yearly award from the Department of Physics, University of Puerto Rico, Río Piedras campus to the most distinguished student in the area of Physics. This award is sponsored by the Bueso family.

See also

List of Puerto Ricans

References

1905 births
1960 deaths
Boating accident deaths
Puerto Rican academics
University of Puerto Rico alumni
University of Puerto Rico faculty
University of Puerto Rico, Río Piedras Campus alumni
Science communicators